David Trottier is an American screenwriter, consultant, author and educator. He's best known for his screenwriting guide, The Screenwriter's Bible.

Career
Trottier graduated with an M.A. from Goddard College, as well as the Hollywood Scriptwriting Institute and the Hollywood Film Institute.

After doing some minor rewrites on Zorro the Gay Blade, Trottier sold his first spec, The Secret of Question Mark Cave to Disney. Trottier would sell projects to Jim Henson Pictures, York Entertainment, On the Bus Productions, ABC and New Century Pictures. These include Igor's Revenge, The Muppet's Hockey Movie—The Comeback Kids (not completed due to Henson's death), Ratman From Saturn, Kumquat, The New Musketeers, and A Window in Time. He also co-wrote and co-produced Hercules Recycled.

Publications

References

External links 
Official Website

Living people
Film theorists
Screenwriting instructors
American male non-fiction writers
American male screenwriters
20th-century American non-fiction writers
21st-century American non-fiction writers
Writers of books about writing fiction
Year of birth missing (living people)
20th-century American male writers
21st-century American male writers